CBV-Index is divided into 10 indices of the ten major industries of Vietnam economy (based on ICB-Industry Classification Benchmark, developed by FTSE and Dow Jones Limited, currently in use by NYSE).  

These are 10 main industries that reflect Vietnam economic growth and have strong correlation with the macroeconomic cycle of Vietnam:

See also
CBV Index
CBV 20
CBV 10

External links

Overview of CBV Sectors from Bien Viet Securities JSC
List of Companies in CBV Sectors

Vietnamese stock market indices